Carotuximab (INN) (TRC-105) is a chimeric monoclonal antibody designed for the treatment of cancer.

This drug was developed by Tracon Pharmaceuticals Inc.

It is at Phase III trials for angiosarcoma.

References 

Monoclonal antibodies